Bolshoye Burtanovo is a rural locality (a village) in Kichmengskoye Rural Settlement, Kichmengsko-Gorodetsky District, Vologda Oblast, Russia. The population was 160 as of 2002. There are 4 streets.

Geography 
Bolshoye Burtanovo is located 14 km southeast of Kichmengsky Gorodok (the district's administrative centre) by road. Sever is the nearest rural locality.

References 

Rural localities in Kichmengsko-Gorodetsky District